Miss Europe 1991 was the 46th edition of the Miss Europe pageant and the 35th edition under the Mondial Events Organization. It was held in Dakar, Senegal on 29 June 1991. Susanne Petry of Germany, was originally crowned Miss Europe 1991, but was later "dismissed" and dethroned. The crown then went to Katerina Michalopoulou of Greece. They both succeeded outgoing titleholder Michela Rocco di Torrepadula of Italy.

Results

Placements

Contestants 

 - Sandra Luttenberger
 - Katia Alens
 - UNKNOWN
 - UNKNOWN
 - UNKNOWN
 - Racquel Jory
 - Liis Tappo
 - Tanja Vienonen
 -  Gaëlle Voiry (Gaille Voiry)
 - Susanne Petry
 - Katerina Michalopoulou
 - Monique Flinkevleugel
 - Antónia Bálint (Bálint Antónia)
 - Sigrún Eva Kristinsdóttir
 - Eleonora Benfatto
 - Greta Bardavelytė (Greta Bardavelite)
 - UNKNOWN
 - Tina Loddengaard
 - Ewa Maria Szymczak
 - Carla Lopes da Costa Caldeira
 - UNKNOWN
 - Karina Ferguson
 - Silvia Jato
 - Marlene Quick
 - Catherine Mesot
 - Defne Samyeli
 - Jane Lloyd

Notes

Withdrawals

Debuts/Returns
 - Was represented in the pageant as the Baltic States back in 1927. This is the first time Lithuania is competing as its own country.

Returns

References

External links 
 

Miss Europe
1991 beauty pageants
1991 in Senegal